The 2015–16 Georgia Tech Yellow Jackets men's basketball team represented the Georgia Institute of Technology during the 2015–16 NCAA Division I men's basketball season. They were led by fifth year head coach Brian Gregory and played their home games at McCamish Pavilion. They were members of the Atlantic Coast Conference. The Yellow Jackets finished the season 21–15, 8–10 in ACC play to finish in a tie for 11th place. They defeated Clemson in the second round of the ACC tournament to advance to the quarterfinals where they lost to Virginia. They received an invitation to the National Invitation Tournament where they defeated Houston and South Carolina to advance to the quarterfinals where they lost to San Diego State.

On March 25, 2016, Georgia Tech announced Brian Gregory would not return as head coach.

Last season
The Yellow Jackets finished the 2014–15 season 12–19, 3–15 in ACC play to finish in 14th place. They lost in the first round of the ACC tournament to Boston College.

Departures

Incoming transfers

Recruiting

Roster

Schedule

|-
!colspan=9 style=| Non-conference regular season

|-
!colspan=9 style=|ACC regular season

|-
!colspan=9 style=| ACC tournament

|-
!colspan=9 style=| NIT

References

Georgia Tech Yellow Jackets men's basketball seasons
Georgia Tech
Georgia Tech
2016 in sports in Georgia (U.S. state)
2015 in sports in Georgia (U.S. state)